Dragan Umičević (born 9 October 1984 in Dubica, SFR Yugoslavia) is a Swedish professional ice hockey player of Serbian descent. He is currently playing for Södertälje SK in the HockeyAllsvenskan (Allsv). Umicevic has represented the Sweden national ice hockey team in 2006 and 2007. With Södertälje SK he won the team's internal scoring league in the 2008–09 Elitserien season. Umičević was drafted by the Edmonton Oilers in the sixth round of the 2003 NHL Entry Draft, 184th overall.

Playing career
Aside from 9 games in Russia in 2007, Umicevic played in Sweden until 2012. He then moved to the Finnish SM-Liiga, where he was known as a playmaker.

At the end of the 2013–14 season he moved to the NLA in Switzerland and signed with EHC Biel for the playoffs. He scored 6 goals and 10 assists in 15 games, earning him a one-year contract with Biel for 2014-15.

For the 2015–16 season, Umicevic signed a one-year contract with the DEL team Kölner Haie. In August 2016, he inked a two-year deal with another German team, Krefeld Pinguine.

Following the 2017–18 season, Umicevic opted to leave as a free agent and sign a new two-year contract in the neighbouring EBEL with Austrian club Steinbach Black Wings Linz on May 1, 2018.

Career statistics

Regular season and playoffs

International

References

External links

1984 births
Ässät players
IF Björklöven players
EHC Biel players
EHC Black Wings Linz players
Edmonton Oilers draft picks
Djurgårdens IF Hockey players
Färjestad BK players
Frölunda HC players
HC CSKA Moscow players
Kölner Haie players
Krefeld Pinguine players
Living people
Malmö Redhawks players
Södertälje SK players
Swedish ice hockey right wingers
Swedish people of Serbian descent
Tappara players